Joyrex J9i is a single by Richard D. James under the alias Caustic Window. The release is a 10 inch vinyl and was limited to an edition of 300 copies. The title of this release is very similar to another Caustic Window release titled Joyrex J9ii.

Joyrex J9i is a limited edition picture disc, featuring a picture of a Roland TB-303 synthesizer on Side A, and a picture of a Roland TR-606 drum machine on Side B. Hand-etched just inside the run-out groove on Side A are the words "THE ACID THAT FELL TO EARTH."

Both tracks were later re-released on the album Compilation.

Track listing

Side A
"Humanoid Must Not Escape" – 5:41

Side B
"Fantasia" – 6:01
No track titles appear anywhere on the release; however, proper titles can be found on Compilation.

References

Aphex Twin EPs
1993 EPs